The 1981 winners of the Torneo di Viareggio (in English, the Viareggio Tournament, officially the Viareggio Cup World Football Tournament Coppa Carnevale), the annual youth football tournament held in Viareggio, Tuscany, are listed below.

Format
The 16 teams are seeded in 4 groups. Each team from a group meets the others in a single tie. The winner of each group progress to the final knockout stage.

Participating teams
Italian teams

  Brescia
  Como
  Fiorentina
  Juventus
  Milan
  Napoli
  Pistoiese
  Roma
  Udinese

European teams

  Ipswich Town
  Dukla Praha
  Crvena zvezda
  Bayer Leverkusen
  Porto
  Újpesti Dózsa

American teams
  Mexico City

Group stage

Group A

Group B

Group C

Group D

Knockout stage

Champions

Footnotes

External links
 Official Site (Italian)
 Results on RSSSF.com

1980
1980–81 in Italian football
1980–81 in Yugoslav football
1980–81 in Portuguese football
1980–81 in Czechoslovak football
1980–81 in English football
1980–81 in Mexican football
1980–81 in Hungarian football
1980–81 in German football